Daniel (Aramaic and ;) is the main character of the Book of Daniel. According to the Hebrew Bible, Daniel was a noble Jewish youth of Jerusalem taken into captivity by Nebuchadnezzar II of Babylon, serving the king and his successors with loyalty and ability until the time of the Persian conqueror Cyrus, all the while remaining true to the God of Israel. While conservative scholars hold that Daniel existed and his book was written in the 6th century BCE, most other scholars agree that Daniel is not a historical figure and that the book is a cryptic allusion to the reign of the 2nd century BCE Hellenistic king Antiochus IV Epiphanes.

Six cities claim the Tomb of Daniel, the most famous being that in Susa, in southern Iran, at a site known as Shush-e Daniyal. He is not a prophet in Judaism, but the rabbis reckoned him to be the most distinguished member of the Babylonian diaspora, unsurpassed in piety and good deeds, firm in his adherence to the Law despite being surrounded by enemies who sought his ruin, and in the first few centuries CE they wrote down the many legends that had grown up around his name. He is considered a prophet in Christianity, and although he is not mentioned in the Quran, Muslim sources describe him as a prophet.

Background

Daniel's name means "God (El) is my judge". While the best known Daniel is the hero of the Book of Daniel who interprets dreams and receives apocalyptic visions, the Bible also briefly mentions three other individuals of this name:
 The Book of Ezekiel (14:14, 14:20 and 28:3) refers to a legendary Daniel famed for wisdom and righteousness. In verse 14:14, Ezekiel says of the sinful land of Israel that "even if these three, Noah, Daniel and Job, were in it, they would deliver but their own lives by their righteousness." In chapter 28, Ezekiel taunts the king of Tyre, asking rhetorically, "art thou wiser than Daniel?" The author of the Book of Daniel appears to have taken this legendary figure, renowned for his wisdom, to serve as his central human character.
 The Book of Ezra (8:2) mentions a priest named Daniel who went from Babylon to Jerusalem with Ezra.
 The First Book of Chronicles (3:1) mentions a son of David called Daniel.

Daniel (Dn'il, or Danel) is also the name of a figure in the Aqhat legend from Ugarit. (Ugarit was a Canaanite city destroyed around 1200 BCE – the tablet containing the story is dated c. 1360 BCE.) This legendary Daniel is known for his righteousness and wisdom and a follower of the god El (hence his name), who made his will known through dreams and visions. It is unlikely that Ezekiel knew the far older Canaanite legend, but it seems reasonable to suppose that some connection exists between the two. The authors of the tales in the first half of the Book of Daniel were likely also unaware of the Ugaritic Daniel and probably took the name of their hero from Ezekiel; the author of the visions in the second half in turn took his hero's name from the tales.

Tales of Daniel

The Book of Daniel begins with an introduction telling how Daniel and his companions came to be in Babylon, followed by a set of tales set in the Babylonian and Persian courts in the late 7th and early 6th centuries BCE, followed in turn by a set of visions in which Daniel sees the remote future of the world and of Israel. The tales in chapters 1–6 can be dated to the 3rd or early 2nd centuries BCE; it is generally accepted that these were expanded by the addition of the visions in chapters 8–12 between 167 and 164 BCE.

In the third year of the reign of Jehoiakim, Daniel and his friends Hananiah, Mishael, and Azariah are taken to Babylon by Nebuchadnezzar, king of Babylon. The four are chosen for their intellect and beauty to be trained in the Babylonian court, and are given new names. Daniel is given the Babylonian name Belteshazzar (written as NIN9.LUGAL.ŠEŠ), while his companions are given the Babylonian names Shadrach, Meshach, and Abednego. Daniel and his friends refuse the food and wine provided by the king of Babylon to avoid becoming defiled. They receive wisdom from God and surpass "all the magicians and enchanters of the kingdom." Nebuchadnezzar dreams of a giant statue made of four metals with feet of mingled iron and clay, smashed by a stone from heaven. Only Daniel is able to interpret it: the dream signifies four kingdoms, of which Babylon is the first, but God will destroy them and replace them with his own kingdom. 

Nebuchadnezzar dreams of a great tree that shelters all the world and of a heavenly figure who decrees that the tree will be destroyed; again, only Daniel can interpret the dream, which concerns the sovereignty of God over the kings of the earth. When Nebuchadnezzar's son King Belshazzar uses the vessels from the Jewish temple for his feast, a hand appears and writes a mysterious message on the wall, which only Daniel can interpret; it tells the king that his kingdom will be given to the Medes and Persians, because Belshazzar, unlike Nebuchadnezzar, has not acknowledged the sovereignty of the God of Daniel. The Medes and Persians overthrow Nebuchadnezzar and the new king, Darius the Mede, appoints Daniel to high authority. Jealous rivals attempt to destroy Daniel with an accusation that he worships God instead of the king, and Daniel is thrown into a den of lions, but an angel saves him, his accusers are destroyed, and Daniel is restored to his position.

In the third year of Darius, Daniel has a series of visions. In the first, four beasts come out of the sea, the last with ten horns, and an eleventh horn grows and achieves dominion over the Earth and the "Ancient of Days" (God) gives dominion to "one like a son of man". An angel interprets the vision. In the second, a ram with two horns is attacked by a goat with one horn; the one horn breaks and is replaced by four. A little horn arises and attacks the people of God and the temple, and Daniel is informed how long the little horn's dominion will endure. In the third, Daniel is troubled to read in holy scripture (the book is not named but appears to be Jeremiah) that Jerusalem would be desolate for 70 years. Daniel repents on behalf of the Jews and requests that Jerusalem and its people be restored. An angel refers to a period of 70 sevens (or weeks) of years. In the final vision, Daniel sees a period of history culminating in a struggle between the "king of the north" and the "king of the south" in which God's people suffer terribly; an angel explains that in the end the righteous will be vindicated and God's kingdom will be established on Earth.

Additional tales (Greek text)

The Greek text of Daniel contains three additional tales, two of which feature Daniel (the third is an expansion of the tale of the fiery furnace).
 The tale of Susanna tells how Daniel saves the reputation of a young Jewish married woman when two lecherous Jewish elders condemn her to death, supposedly for unchastity, but actually because she resisted their advances. Daniel's clever cross-examination unmasks their evil and leads to their deaths. The story is unique in that the villains are Jews instead of heathens; it may have been written as a polemic by the Pharisees against the Saducees, who, according to their opponents, were abusing their control of the courts.
 Bel and the Dragon consists of two episodes. In the first Daniel exposes the deceptions of the heathen priests, who have been pretending that their idols eat and drink (in fact it is the priests who have been consuming the food set out for the false gods). In the second Daniel destroys a giant serpent that Cyrus believes to be a god; the Babylonians revolt, Cyrus imprisons Daniel without food, the prophet Habakkuk miraculously feeds him, and Cyrus repents.

Death and tomb of Daniel

The last mention of Daniel in the Book of Daniel is in the third year of Cyrus. Rabbinic sources suppose that he was still alive during the reign of the Persian king Ahasuerus (better known as Artaxerxes – Babylonian Talmud, Megillah 15a, based on the Book of Esther 4, 5), but he was killed by Haman, the wicked prime minister of Ahasuerus (Targum Sheini on Esther, 4, 11).

The 1st century Jewish writer Josephus reported that Daniel's body lay in a tower in Ecbatana in Parthia, alongside the bodies of the kings of the Medes and Persians; later Jewish authorities said he was buried in Susa, and that near his house were hidden the vessels from the Temple of Solomon. Muslim sources reported that the Muslims had discovered his body, or possibly only a box containing his nerves and veins, together with a book, a jar of fat, and a signet ring engraved with the image of a man being licked by two lions. The corpse was reburied, and those who buried it were decapitated to prevent them from revealing the spot.

Today six cities claim Daniel's Tomb: Babylon, Kirkuk and Muqdadiyah in Iraq, Susa and Malamir in Iran, and Samarkand in Uzbekistan. The most famous is that in Susa, (Shush, in southern Iran), at a site known as Shush-e Daniyal. According to Jewish tradition the rich and poor of the city quarreled over possession of the body, and the bier was therefore suspended from a chain over the centre of the river. A house of prayer open to all who believed in God was built nearby, and fishing was prohibited for a certain distance up and down the river; fish that swam in that section of the river had heads that glinted like gold, and ungodly persons who entered the sacred precinct would miraculously drown in the river. To this day the tomb is a popular site of pilgrimage.

Daniel in later tradition

Judaism

Daniel is not a prophet in Judaism: prophecy is reckoned to have ended with Haggai, Zechariah, and Malachi. In the Hebrew Bible his book is not included under the Prophets (the Hebrew Bible has three sections, Torah, Prophets and Writings), perhaps because its content does not match the prophetic books; but nevertheless the eight copies found among the Dead Sea Scrolls and the additional tales of the Greek text are a testament to Daniel's popularity in ancient times.

The Jewish rabbis of the first millennium CE reckoned Daniel to be the most distinguished member of the Babylonian diaspora, unsurpassed in piety and good deeds, firm in his adherence to the Law despite being surrounded by enemies who sought his ruin, and in the first few centuries CE they wrote down the legends that had grown up around his name. His captivity was foretold by the prophet Isaiah to King Hezekiah in these words, "they (Hezekiah's descendants) shall be eunuchs in the palace of the king of Babylon." This misfortune was turned to a blessing when Daniel and his three companions were able to show their mutilated bodies to Nebuchadnezzar and so prove their innocence of charges of leading an unchaste life.

Daniel kept the welfare of Nebuchadnezzar in mind continually, and when the king was condemned by God to live as a beast for a certain period Daniel prayed that the period of punishment should be shortened, and his prayer was granted. When Nebuchadnezzar was dying he wished to include Daniel among his heirs, but Daniel refused the honour, saying that he could not leave the inheritance of his forefathers for that of the uncircumcised. Daniel also restored the sight of king Darius, who had wrongly thrown the pious Daniel into prison on false charges, upon which many converted to Judaism.

Christianity

The New Testament makes a reference to Daniel at Matthew  24:15, in reference to the abomination of desolation. He is commemorated in the Coptic Church on the 23rd day of the Coptic month of Baramhat. On the Eastern Orthodox liturgical calendar, the feast days celebrating St. Daniel the Prophet together with the Three Young Men, falls on December 17 (during the Nativity Fast), on the Sunday of the Holy Forefathers (the Sunday which falls between 11 and 17 December), and on the Sunday before Nativity. Daniel's prophecy regarding the stone which smashed the idol is often used in Orthodox hymns as a metaphor for the Incarnation: the "stone cut out" being symbolic of the Logos (Christ), and the fact that it was cut "without hands" being symbolic of the virgin birth. Thus the hymns will refer to the Theotokos (Virgin Mary) as the "uncut mountain".

The Roman Catholic Church commemorates St. Daniel in the Roman Martyrology on July 21. Some local liturgical calendars of dioceses also list his feast, sometimes on July 21 and sometimes on another day. For example, the archdiocese of Gorizia celebrates the feast of St. Daniel, prophet and confessor, on September 11. The reading of the Mass is taken from the Book of Daniel, chapter 14; the Gradual from Psalm 91; the Alleluia verse from the Epistle of James 1; and the Gospel from Matthew 24. The Calendar of Saints of the Lutheran Church–Missouri Synod commemorates Daniel, together with the Three Young Men (Shadrach, Meshach, and Abednego), on December 17.

Islam

Daniel (Arabic: دانيال, Dānyāl) is not mentioned by name in the Qur'an, but there are accounts of his prophet-hood in later Muslim literature, which tells how he was rescued from lions with the aid of the prophet Jeremiah (in Bel and the Dragon it is the prophet Habakkuk who plays this role) and interpreted the king's dream of a statue made of four metals destroyed by a rock from heaven, as having interpreted the writing on the wall, investigation, etc. All sources, both classical and modern, describe him as a saintly and righteous man. Abdullah Yusuf Ali (1872–1953) in his Qur'anic commentary says:

In Kitab al-Kafi, Imam Ali ibn Husayn Zayn al-Abidin asserts that Allah revealed to Daniel that, "The most hated among my creatures are the ignorant ones who disrespect the scholars and do not follow them. The Most beloved to Me in My servants are the pious ones who work hard to become entitled for greater rewards, who always stay close to the scholars, follow the fore-bearing people and accept (the advice of) people of wisdom". Shiʾa hadith affirm Daniel as a prophet of God, and affirm the events aligning to the biblical narrative of Daniel as well.

Baháʼí
Daniel is considered a minor prophet in the teachings of the Baháʼí Faith. Some Baháʼí converts introduced the principle of reincarnation, specifically that of Daniel and John.

See also

 Apocalypse of Daniel
 Arioch, Captain of the guard
 List of names referring to El
 Persian Jews

Notes

References

Bibliography

External links 

 
 

 
Ancient apocalypticists
Ancient Jewish writers
Angelic visionaries
Book of Daniel people
Dragonslayers
Hebrew Bible people
Iranian Jews
Jewish writers
People whose existence is disputed
Prophets in Christianity